{{Infobox writer 
| name        = N. K. Desam എൻ കെ ദേശം 

| pseudonym   = 
| other_name  = 
| image = Nknew2021.jpg
| birth_date   = 
| birth_place  = Desam, Alwaye
| birth_name  = N. Kuttikrishna Pillai
| occupation  = Poet, literary critic, translator
| language    = Malayalam
| alma_mater  = 
| nationality = Indian
| genre       =  
| subject     = 
| notableworks = Mudra, Gitanjali(transalation of Tagore poem)**
| movement    = 
| influences  = 
| influenced  = 
| spouse      = Leela
| awards      = Kerala Sahitya Akademi Award, Odakkuzhal AwardKendra Sahitya Academy award -2016**
| website     = 
}}
N. Kuttikrishna Pillai, better known as N. K. Desam (born 31 October 1936), is a Malayalam-language poet and literary critic from the south Indian state of Kerala. His poetry collection Mudra'' won the Kerala Sahitya Akademi Award in 2009. In 2017 his Malayalam transliteration of Gitanjali (Tagore's great work ) selected for Kendra Sahithya Academy Award

Biography
He was born in 1936 in Desom village near Alwaye.

Works
 Name                                       year                       Publisher 
 1)     Anthimalari                       1973       Sahithya pravarthaka co-op society, Kottayam
 2)     Kanyahridayam                1975       Sahithya pravarthaka co-op society, Kottayam
 3)     Appooppanthadi               1979       Kerala Sahithya Academy, Thrissur
 4)     Chottayile Seelam            1979       SPCS, Kottayam 
 5)     Pavizhamalli                     1981       Sahithya pravarthaka co-op society, Kottayam
 6)     Ullekham                         1984       National Book Stall , Kottayam
 7)     Anpathonnaksharalee1999       S.T.Reddiar & Sons, Kochi 
 8)     Elimeesa                          2001       SPCS, Kottayam 
 9)     Kavyakeli                          2003       Green Books, Thrissur
 10)  Mudra                                2006       Current books, Kottayam 
 11)  Mazhathullikal                    2006       Kurukshethra Publications, Kochi 
 12)  Geetanjali                          2010       Green Books, Thrissur 
 13)  Vyloppilli Kathakavithakal   2016       Green Books, Thrissur
 14)  Desikam - complete works  2021     Vallathol Vidyapeedam (NBS)

Awards
 Edasseri Award                          Ponnani                        1982       Ullekhm
 Kavanakuthukam award            Thrissur                        1987       Anthyapranamam
 Bodhi                                          Aluva                            1992       Total contribution  
 Nattarangu                                Thiruvananthapuram     1984       Total contribution
 Sahodaran Ayyappan                Cherayi                           2007       Mudra 
 Odakkuzhal                               Kochi                              2007       Mudra 
 Nalappatt                                  Punnayurkkulam            2008       Mudra 
 Vennikulam                              Thodiyur                          2008       Mudra
 Kerala Sahitya Akademi       Thrissur                           2009       Mudra 
 Katharagam                             Bangaluru                       2009       Mudra
 Changampuzha                       Kochi                               2010       Mudra 
 Cherukad Award                               Perithalmanna                2011       Mudra
 Asan Memorial                         Chennai                          2013       Total contribution 
 Krishnankutty Memorial           Thrissur                           2013       Contribution to Aksharaslokam 
 Mukthakam                              Thrissur                           2013          -do-
 Kavikulapathi                           Pambakuda                     2013           -do- 
 Paanini Puraskaaram              Mavelikkara                     2017            -do- 
 Kaliyath Damodaran                Thrissur                           2013       Gitanjali 
 Mukthakasree                          Chengamanad                2017       Total contribution 
 Chethala Vaishnavam               Shornur                           2017       Total contribution
 Sahitya Akademi Translation Prize        Chandigarh                     2016       Gitanjali (Translation)
 Ulloor Award        Thiruvananthapuram                 2018       Mudra
 Ettumanoor Somadasan Award     Ettumanoor               2019       Various Works

References

External links
 

1936 births
Living people
Indian male poets
Malayali people
People from Aluva
Poets from Kerala
Malayalam-language writers
Malayalam poets
Recipients of the Kerala Sahitya Akademi Award
Malayalam literary critics
20th-century Indian poets
Indian literary critics
20th-century Indian male writers
Recipients of the Sahitya Akademi Prize for Translation
Recipients of the Ulloor Award